Marianne Louise Limpert (born October 10, 1972) is a Canadian former freestyle and medley swimmer who competed in the Summer Olympics for Canada in 1992, 1996 and 2000, and won the silver medal in the 200-metre individual medley in 1996 in Atlanta, Georgia.  She was also Canada's flagbearer at the 1998 Commonwealth Games in Kuala Lumpur, Malaysia.

The University of New Brunswick, in her hometown of Fredericton, New Brunswick, has an annual swim meet, the Marianne Limpert Team Cup, named after her.

At the 1993 Pan Pacific Swimming Championships, she won a bronze medal in the 4x100-metre freestyle relay.

At the 1995 Pan American Games, she won two silver medals in the 200-metre freestyle and in the 200-metre individual medley, and a bronze medal in the 100-metre freestyle.

At the 1995 Pan Pacific Swimming Championships, she won a bronze medal in the 4x200-metre freestyle relay.

At the 1997 Pan Pacific Swimming Championships, she won two silver medals in the 200-metre individual medley and in the 4x200-metre freestyle relay.

At the 1999 Pan American Games, she won two gold medals in the 4x100 and 4x200-metre freestyle relay, and a bronze medal in the 100-metre freestyle.

At the 1999 Pan Pacific Swimming Championships, she won two bronze medals in the 4x100 and 4x200-metre freestyle relay.

See also
 List of Olympic medalists in swimming (women)
 List of Commonwealth Games medallists in swimming (women)

References

External links
 Profile at FINA.org
 

1972 births
Living people
Canadian female freestyle swimmers
Canadian female medley swimmers
Medalists at the 1996 Summer Olympics
Medalists at the FINA World Swimming Championships (25 m)
Olympic silver medalists for Canada
Olympic swimmers of Canada
Pan American Games gold medalists for Canada
Pan American Games silver medalists for Canada
Pan American Games bronze medalists for Canada
People from Nord-du-Québec
Sportspeople from Quebec
Sportspeople from Fredericton
New Brunswick Sports Hall of Fame inductees
Swimmers at the 1992 Summer Olympics
Swimmers at the 1994 Commonwealth Games
Swimmers at the 1995 Pan American Games
Swimmers at the 1996 Summer Olympics
Swimmers at the 1998 Commonwealth Games
Swimmers at the 1999 Pan American Games
Swimmers at the 2000 Summer Olympics
Swimmers at the 2002 Commonwealth Games
UBC Thunderbirds swimmers
Commonwealth Games gold medallists for Canada
Commonwealth Games silver medallists for Canada
Commonwealth Games bronze medallists for Canada
Olympic silver medalists in swimming
Commonwealth Games medallists in swimming
Pan American Games medalists in swimming
Universiade medalists in swimming
Universiade gold medalists for Canada
Medalists at the 1993 Summer Universiade
Medalists at the 1995 Pan American Games
Medalists at the 1999 Pan American Games
20th-century Canadian women
Medallists at the 1994 Commonwealth Games
Medallists at the 1998 Commonwealth Games
Medallists at the 2002 Commonwealth Games